Bennur may refer to several places in India:

Karnataka
Bennur, Bagalkot
Bennur, Belgaum
Bennur, Dharwad